Vishera River is the name of several rivers in Russia:

Vishera (Komi Republic), a tributary of the Vychegda
Vishera (Perm Krai), a tributary of the Kama
Vishera (Novgorod Oblast), a tributary of the Volkhov
Bolshaya Vishera, its tributary
Malaya Vishera, its tributary

See also 
Vishera (disambiguation)